The Ferrari 246 F1 is a Ferrari racing car built for the Formula One World Championship of 1958.

246 F1
The Formula One regulations for 1954–1960 limited naturally aspirated engines to 2500 cc and for the 1958 season there was a change from alcohol fuels to avgas. The 246 F1 used a  Dino V6 engine with a 65° angle between the cylinder banks. Bore X Stroke:  This was the first use of a V6 engine in a Formula One car, but otherwise the 246 F1 was a conventional front-engine design. The Ferrari 246 F1 was good enough to win a World Championship for Mike Hawthorn and a second place in the Constructors' Championship for Ferrari.

The Ferrari 246 F1 was not only the first V6-engined car to win a Formula One Grand Prix, the French Grand Prix at Reims in 1958, it was also the last front-engined car to win a Formula One Grand Prix. This occurred at the 1960 Italian Grand Prix at Monza, where the major British teams boycotted the race.

In 1960, the Ferrari 246 designation was also used for the first mid-/rear-engined Ferrari, the 246 P Formula One car (using same Dino V6 engine of 2,417.34 cc), and then again in 1966 for Ferrari's first three-litre era Formula One car.

256 F1
In 1959, to make a full use of the allowed capacity regulations, Ferrari enlarged the bore of the Dino V6 engine of the 246 F1 car by 1 mm to 86 mm. This allowed the total displacement to rise to 2474.54 cc. The resulting power output was now  at 8600 rpm. The new car also received disc brakes as standard and a five-speed gearbox. Only Tony Brooks raced this model but he was outpaced by the mid-engined British cars. He still won in the French and German Grands Prix.

Formula One World Championship results
(key)

1Includes 6 points scored by Dino 156 F2.

Notes

References
 Grand Prix Racing – Ferrari Dino 246

External links
Ferrari 246 F1: Ferrari History
Ferrari 256 F1: Ferrari History

246 F1
Formula One championship-winning cars